On 23 September 2006, a Shree Air Mil Mi-8 helicopter crashed on a chartered flight from Phungling to Ghunsa in Eastern Nepal. The accident killed all 24 passengers and crew on board, including an expedition of World Wide Fund for Nature.

Aircraft 
The helicopter involved with the accident was a Mil Mi-8 MTV 1.

Crew and victims 
On board the helicopter was an expedition of World Wide Fund for Nature returning from an conservation event in Taplejung District, where the Government of Nepal handed the management of the park around Kanchenjunga to the local people. The WWF team included Chandra Gurung and Harka Gurung. Other passengers on board the ill-fated helicopter included politician Gopal Rai.

Incident 
The helicopter took off at 10:45 NPT on 23 September 2006. Shortly afterwards, the helicopter was declared missing. Two days later, the wreckage of the helicopter was found south-west of Ghunsa. Bad weather was assumed to have caused the crash at the beginning.

Investigation
The final report on the accident the committee of the Civil Aviation Authority of Nepal stated that the pilots entering cloudy areas in unfamiliar terrain as well as bad crew resource management were the main causes of the accident. It furthermore criticized the operating airline, Shree Air, on their training proceedings.

Aftermath
A day of mourning was observed throughout Nepal and schools and public offices were closed on 27 September 2006.

References 

Aviation accidents and incidents in 2006
Aviation accidents and incidents in Nepal
Aviation accidents and incidents caused by pilot error
2006 in Nepal
Accidents and incidents involving the Mil Mi-8
2006 disasters in Nepal